Måns Grenhagen (born 20 July 1993) is a Swedish racing driver. In 2013 he started in the FIA Formula 3 European Championship, competing for Dutch racing team Van Amersfoort Racing.

Career 
Grenhagen began his racing career in karting 2006. He remained in karting until 2009. In 2007 he won the Swedish ICA Junior Championship. In 2008 he won the Swedish KF3 Championship. 2009 he began his formula racing career. He started in the Formula Lista junior. He concluded the season on the eighth position with a second place as his best result. 2010 Grenhagen got a cockpit at Jenzer Motorsport in the Formula Abarth. He participated in the first four rounds of the championship. Two fourth places were his best results. He ended on the 15th place in the standings. Moreover he took part in two races of the Swedish Formula Renault.

After a year without motorsport Grenhagen raced again in 2012. He started for EmiliodeVillota Motorsport in the European F3 Open Championship. He won a race in the Winter Series, which was before the opening of the regular season. Grenhagen won four races in the regular championship. He finished nine times on the podium. As the best driver of his team he concluded the season on the third place of the championship. 2013 Grenhagen switched to the FIA European Formula Three Championship. He started the season for Van Amersfoort Racing, but was replaced by Sven Müller before the end of the season.

Career summary 
 2006–2009: Karting
 2009: Formula Lista Junior (8th position)
 2010: Formula Abarth (15th position)
 2010: Swedish Formula Renault
 2012: European F3 Open Championship, Winter Series
 2012: European F3 Open Championship (3rd place)
 2013: FIA Formula 3 European Championship

References

External links 
 
 

1993 births
Living people
Swedish racing drivers
Formula Abarth drivers
Euroformula Open Championship drivers
FIA Formula 3 European Championship drivers
Formula Lista Junior drivers
Sweden Formula Renault 2.0 drivers
Morand Racing drivers
Van Amersfoort Racing drivers
De Villota Motorsport drivers
Jenzer Motorsport drivers